Marta Anna Walczykiewicz (born 1 August 1987) is a Polish sprint canoeist who has competed since the late 2000s. She won eleven medals at the ICF Canoe Sprint World Championships with one gold (K-1 4 x 200 m: 2014), eight silvers (K-1 200 m: 2009, 2011, 2013, 2014, 2015; K-2 200 m: 2010, K-1 200 m relay: 2013, K-4 500 m: 2014) and a bronze (K-2 200 m: 2007).

Career
At the 2015 European Games Walczykiewicz won Poland's first gold medal in the K-1 200 m event. In June 2015, she competed in the inaugural European Games, for Poland in canoe sprint, and won a gold medal in the K-1 200m.

She competed for Poland at the 2016 Summer Olympics in the women's K-1 200 metres and the women's K-4 500 metres. She won the silver medal in the women's K-1 200 m event. Her team in the women's K-4 500 m event finished in 9th place. Walczykiewicz was the flag bearer for Poland during the closing ceremony.  She also competed at the 2012 Summer Olympics.

References

External links

Canoe09.ca profile

1987 births
Canoeists at the 2012 Summer Olympics
Canoeists at the 2016 Summer Olympics
Medalists at the 2016 Summer Olympics
ICF Canoe Sprint World Championships medalists in kayak
Living people
Olympic canoeists of Poland
Polish female canoeists
Sportspeople from Kalisz
European Games medalists in canoeing
European Games gold medalists for Poland
Canoeists at the 2015 European Games
Olympic silver medalists for Poland
Olympic medalists in canoeing
Canoeists at the 2019 European Games
European Games bronze medalists for Poland
Canoeists at the 2020 Summer Olympics
20th-century Polish women
21st-century Polish women